Steinstraße/Königsallee is a major underground station on the Düsseldorf Stadtbahn lines U70, U74, U75, U76, U77, U78 and U79 in Düsseldorf. The station lies on the junction of Steinstraße and Königsallee in the district of Stadtmitte.

The station was opened in 1988 and consists of two island platform with four rail tracks on three levels. On the surface, Interchange to Tram lines 701, 705 and 706 is possible.

External links 

 

Düsseldorf VRR stations
Railway stations in Germany opened in 1988